Elmhirst is a surname. Notable people with the surname include:

 Edward Elmhirst (1811-1893), cricketer
 Leonard Knight Elmhirst (1893-1974), English agronomist and philanthropist
 Dorothy Payne Whitney (1887-1968), American-born social activist and philanthropist (sometimes known as Dorothy Elmhirst)
 Thomas Elmhirst (1895-1982), a senior commander in the Royal Air Force
 Tom Elmhirst (born 1971), British music producer and mix engineer

See also
 The Elmhirst School, a former school in Barnsley, England
 Elmhurst (disambiguation)